The Haji Ali Dargah is a mosque and dargah or the monument of Pir Haji Ali Shah Bukhari located on an islet off the coast of Worli in the southern Mumbai.

An exquisite example of Indo-Islamic Architecture, associated with legends about doomed lovers, the dargah contains the tomb of Haji Ali Shah Bukhari. Bukhari was a Sufi saint and a wealthy merchant from Uzbekistan. Near the heart of the city proper, the dargah is one of the most recognisable landmarks of Mumbai.

Background

The Haji Ali Dargah was constructed in 1431 in memory of a wealthy Muslim merchant, Sayyed Pir Haji Ali Shah Bukhari, who gave up all his worldly possessions before making a pilgrimage to Mecca. Hailing from Bukhara, in present-day Uzbekistan, Bukhari travelled around the world in the early to mid 15th century, and eventually settled in present-day Mumbai.

According to legends surrounding his life, once the saint saw a poor woman crying on the road, holding an empty vessel. He asked her what the problem was, she sobbed that her husband would thrash her as she stumbled and accidentally spilled the oil she was carrying. He asked her to take him to the spot where she spilt the oil. There, he jabbed a finger into the soil and the oil gushed out. The overjoyed woman filled up the vessel and went home.

Later, Pir Haji Ali Shah Bukhari had a recurring and disturbing dream that he had injured Earth by his act. Full of remorse and grief from that day he started keeping unwell. Then with the permission of his mother, he traveled to India with his brother and finally reached the shore of Mumbai – near Worli or at some place opposite the present tomb. His brother went back to their native place. Pir Haji Ali Shah Bukhari sent a letter with him to their mother informing her that he was keeping good health and that he had decided to reside at that place permanently for the spread of Islam and that she should forgive him.
 
Until his death he kept spreading knowledge about Islam to the people and his devotees would regularly visit him. Before his death he advised his followers that they should not bury him at any proper place or graveyard and should drop his shroud ('kafan') in the ocean such that it should be buried by the people where it is found.
 
His wish was obeyed by his followers. That is why the Dargah Sharief is built at the very site where his Shroud came to rest in the middle of the sea where it perched on a small mound of rocks rising above the sea. The Tomb and Dargah Sharief were built in the years to come.

On Thursdays and Fridays, the shrine is visited by an enormous number of pilgrims. Irrespective of faith and religion, people visit the dargah to get the blessings of the holy saint. Sometimes, especially on Fridays, various Sufi musicians perform a form of devotional music called Qawwali at the dargah.

Structure

The Dargah is built on a tiny islet located 500 meters from the coast, in the middle of Worli Bay, in the vicinity of Worli. The edifice is a brilliant specimen of the Indo-Islamic style of architecture. The islet is linked to the city precinct of Mahalakshmi by a narrow causeway, which is nearly a kilometre (0.62 mile) long.

The accessibility to the dargah is dependent on the tides. As the causeway is not bound by railings, when the causeway gets submerged during high tide it becomes inaccessible.  Therefore, the dargah is accessible only during low tide. This walk on the causeway, with the sea on both sides, is one of the highlights of a trip to the shrine.

The whitewashed structure occupies an area of a marble courtyard contains the central shrine. The tomb within the mosque is covered by a brocaded red and green chaddar (tomb cover sheet). It is supported by an exquisite silver frame, supported by marble pillars. The main hall has marble pillars embellished with artistic mirror work: blue, green, yellow chips of glass arranged in kaleidoscopic patterns interspersed with Arabic patterns which spell the ninety-nine names of Allah. As per the Muslim traditions separate praying rooms for ladies and gents are provided here to pay their respects. During the high tide, the dargah seems completely isolated with no access.

Repair and renovation

The six-hundred-year-old dargah structure constantly erodes, due to saline winds and the impact of 80,000 visitors per week. While extensive renovations were carried out in 1960 and 1964, the most recent structural upgrade of the dargah started in October 2008. The dargah will be beautified with first and second quality white marble, which will be brought from Makrana, Rajasthan, the same place from where marble for the Taj Mahal was brought.

The repair and structural work is envisaged to take twenty-four months to be conducted in two phases. "Phase One" will involve reconstruction of the mosque and minarets, "Phase Two" will involve renovation of the sanitarium building. When the reconstruction work is complete, the holy shrine will have the feel of a taj right in Mumbai's brackish sea water.

Haji Ali for all movement
'Haji Ali for all' is a feminist movement launched by Bharatiya Muslim Mahila Andolan and Bhumata Brigade to secure equal 'right to pray' even near sanctum sanctorum i.e. traditional patriarchal prohibited area. On 26 August 2016, the Bombay High Court ruled that women could enter the sanctum sanctorum. The trust of the shrine informed the Supreme Court on 24 October that women will be allowed to enter it in a month. Women were allowed to enter the shrine on 29 November 2016, after a ban imposed on them in June 2012.

Popular culture
 "Piya Haji Ali" song, from movie Fiza, was filmed in Haji Ali Dargah.
 Mumbai Meri Jaan, a 2008 Indian film, set a scene here.
 The climax of the super hit Hindi movie Coolie (1983) was shot in Haji Ali Dargah.
 There are several references to the Haji Ali mosque in Shantaram, the 2003 novel by Gregory David Roberts.

See also
 Moinuddin Chishti
 Ashraf Jahangir Semnani
 Nizamuddin Awliya
 Turabul Haq Dargah

References

Further reading
 History of Pir Haji Ali Shah Bukhari (R.A.)
 Haji Ali to be razed, rebuilt, Manoj R Nair, pg 1, Mumbai Mirror; Sunday, 28 August 2005.
 Haji Ali Dargah, Muslim Pilgrimage 
 Haji Ali Mosque, Pilgrimage-India.com
 
 Haji Ali Dargah to rise again in Makrana marble 
 HAJI ALI DARGAH, History and Structure

External links
 Official website of Haji Ali Dargah Trust, Mumbai.

Mosques in Mumbai
Ziyarat
Dargahs in India
Religious buildings and structures in Mumbai